Michael John Moore  (born 2 April 1950) is a public health leader, academic and former Australian politician. He was an independent member of the Australian Capital Territory Legislative Assembly for four terms, from 1989 to 2001. He served as Australia's first independent minister as Minister for Health and Community Care  from 1998 to 2001 in the Liberal minority government led by Chief Minister, Kate Carnell and later, Gary Humphries.

Early life and education 
Moore holds a post-graduate diploma in education, a master's degree in population health and a PhD from the University of Canberra. Moore was received a master's degree in Population Health at the Australian National University in 1997. Moore is a Distinguished Fellow at the George Institute for Global Health, a visiting professor at the University of Technology, Sydney and an Adjunct Professor with the University of Canberra.

Before politics, Moore was a high school teacher and an Army Reservist.

Politics
In 1989, Moore was elected as a Residents Rally member to the first multi-member single-constituency unicameral ACT Legislative Assembly. No party had won a majority, and Rosemary Follett's Labor Party formed a minority government. He was re-elected for a second term at the single-constituency 1992 general election with Helen Szuty as part of the Michael Moore Independent Group, and at the 1995 and 1998 general elections as Moore Independents. He represented the electorate of Molonglo.

He was Minister for Housing, Corrections and Children's Services and was Manager of Government Business. He chaired the Australian Ministerial Councils for both Health and Corrections.

Moore was a social progressive who was responsible for the legalisation of prostitution, the decriminalisation of cannabis and was a strong advocate for trialling the provision of heroin to dependent users. He was a joint founder of the Australian Parliamentary Group on Drug Law Reform, the Australian Drug Law Reform Foundation and sponsored the early meetings of the group Families and Friends for Drug Law Reform.

Other positions
Since 2006, he has been a political and social columnist with the Canberra City News. From 2008 until 2018, Moore served as chief executive officer of the Public Health Association of Australia.

References

Australian schoolteachers
Australian columnists
1950 births
Living people
Members of the Australian Capital Territory Legislative Assembly
Residents Rally members of the Australian Capital Territory Legislative Assembly
Independent members of the Australian Capital Territory Legislative Assembly
21st-century Australian politicians
Australian public health doctors